Kamerik is a village in the Dutch province of Utrecht. It is a part of the municipality of Woerden and is situated about 3 km north of Woerden.

In 2010 the village of Kamerik (including Kanis) had 3808 inhabitants. The built-up area of the town was 0.43 km² and contained 877 residences. The statistical district "Kamerik and Kanis", which includes two villages and the surrounding countryside, has a population of around 3050. This does not include the separate villages of Kamerik-Mijzijde and Oud-Kamerik.

Until it was merged with Woerden in 1989 Kamerik was a separate municipality. Between 1818 and 1857 it was split into two municipalities: Kamerik-Mijzijde on the west side, and Kamerik-Houtdijken on the east.

References

Populated places in Utrecht (province)
Former municipalities of Utrecht (province)
Woerden
1857 establishments in the Netherlands